The Earl's Palace is a ruined Renaissance-style palace near St Magnus's Cathedral in the centre of Kirkwall, Orkney, Scotland. Built by Patrick, Earl of Orkney, its construction began in 1607 and was largely undertaken via forced labour. Today, the ruins are open to the public.

History
The palace was built after Patrick, Earl of Orkney, decided that the accommodation provided by the Bishop's Palace was inadequate for his needs. Earl Patrick is widely acknowledged to have been one of the most tyrannical noblemen in Scotland's history. He decided to extend the complex by building a new palace on the adjoining land. This was complicated by the fact he did not actually own this property. He quickly acquired it by fabricating charges of theft against the unfortunate owner, trying him and having him executed. Upon his imprisonment at Edinburgh in 1609, his bastard son Robert began a rebellion on his behalf and seized the palace, along with nearby St Magnus's Cathedral and Kirkwall Castle. An army led by the Earl of Caithness laid siege, and the Castle was destroyed. Earl Patrick and his son were later executed for treason.

After the Earl's death, the palace continued to be the residence of the Bishops of Orkney sporadically until 1688, when it became the property of the Crown, and fell into ruin in the 18th century.

Today
The palace is currently in the possession of Historic Environment Scotland as a protected scheduled monument.

Sources

Bibliography

External links

 Information at Historic Environment Scotland
Orkneyjar - The Earl's Palace, Kirkwall

Kirkwall
Houses completed in the 17th century
Category A listed buildings in Orkney
Castles in Orkney
Listed castles in Scotland
Scheduled Ancient Monuments in Orkney
Historic Scotland properties in Orkney
Historic house museums in Orkney
Ruined palaces
Ruins in Orkney